The Lebanese National Resistance Front – LNRF or Front National de la Résistance Libanaise (FNRL) in French, but best known by its Arabic acronym, ‘Jammoul’ (جمول), was an underground guerrilla alliance active in Lebanon in the 1980s. It acted as a successor to the Lebanese National Movement, which ceased to exist after the Israeli invasion of Lebanon.

Origins 
This organization was founded on September 16, 1982, the same day the Israeli army entered West Beirut. The secretary general of the central committee of the Lebanese Communist Party (LCP) George Hawi, the secretary general of the Organization of Communist Action – Lebanon (OCAL) Muhsin Ibrahim, the Arab Socialist Action Party – Lebanon (ASAP-L) secretary general Hussein Hamdan, the Arab Socialist Ba'ath Party – Lebanon Region, and the Syrian Social Nationalist Party in Lebanon (SSNP) issued that day a joint communiqué calling for the Lebanese people to raise up in arms and unite into a "Lebanese National Resistance Front" against the Israeli Occupation.

The pro-Syrian Arab Democratic Party (ADP) and the Lebanese Armed Revolutionary Factions (LARF) soon rallied to the LNRF banner, which gained full support of Palestine Liberation Organization (PLO) leftist and Marxist factions based in Lebanon, mainly from the Popular Front for the Liberation of Palestine (PFLP) and the Democratic Front for the Liberation of Palestine (DFLP).

Structure and organization 
The LNRF did not have the strength of other larger militant groups in Lebanon, but by all accounts, it was a highly effective force, being estimated at some 200–500 or so fighters drawn from the LCP, OCAL, LABP, ADP, LARF, PFLP and DFLP, placed under the overall command of Elias Atallah. A joint operational HQ was established at the village of Kfar Rumman in the Jabal Amel region of southern Lebanon, with Hawi and Ibrahim meeting daily in secret to coordinate the activities of the Front's underground cells at west Beirut, Sidon, Tyre and Nabatiyeh in southern Lebanon.

Most observers believe that the Front was a pro-Syrian organization whose membership was primarily Lebanese. However, the PLO stated that the actions claimed by the LNRF were actually carried out by isolated Palestinian guerrilla cells and some radical Lebanese leftists who supported them.

Activities: 1982–85 
The LNRF carried out 128 guerrilla attacks against the IDF and Israeli-related targets in Beirut, Mount Lebanon and the South in June, July and August 1983. At this point it was known as the Lebanese National Salvation Front and was backed by Syria.

Decline and demise: 1986–2000 
A considerable number of LNRF fighters were killed in combat while fighting Israeli and South Lebanese Army (SLA) troops, whereas militants such as Anwar Yassin and Soha Bechara were taken prisoner and held in the infamous Khiam detention center. Several others were killed in assassinations against leftist activists in Beirut and southern Lebanon in the late 1980s.

The last recorded Jammoul operation in the south occurred in 1999.

Notes

See also 
 Lebanese Civil War
 Lebanese National Movement
 Union of Lebanese Democratic Youth

References 
 Denise Ammoun, Histoire du Liban contemporain: Tome 2 1943–1990, Fayard, Paris 2005.  (in French) – 
 Edgar O'Ballance, Civil War in Lebanon, 1975–92, Palgrave Macmillan, 1998. 
 Jean Sarkis, Histoire de la guerre du Liban, Presses Universitaires de France – PUF, Paris 1993.  (in French)
 Rex Brynen, Sanctuary and Survival: the PLO in Lebanon, Boulder: Westview Press, Oxford 1990.  – 
 Robert Fisk, Pity the Nation: Lebanon at War, London: Oxford University Press, (3rd ed. 2001).

External links
http://www.jammoul.net

 
Factions in the Lebanese Civil War
Israeli–Lebanese conflict